2018 China Open may refer to:

2018 China Open (badminton), 18–23 September in Changzhou, Jiangsu
2018 China Open (curling), 16–22 October in Chongqing
2018 China Open (snooker), 2–8 April in Beijing
2018 China Open (table tennis), 31 May – 3 June in Shenzhen
2018 China Open (tennis), 1–7 October in Beijing

See also
2018 Chinese Taipei Open, 2–7 October, a badminton tournament
2018 Fuzhou China Open,  6–11 November, a badminton tournament